St Paul's Church is in Church Street, Bury, Greater Manchester, England.  A former Anglican parish church, it is now redundant and, following fire damage, has been converted into residential use.  The former church is recorded in the National Heritage List for England as a designated Grade II listed building.

History

The church was built in 1838–42, and designed by John Harper of York.  The land for the church was given by the 13th Earl of Derby.  In 1898 the Lancaster architects Austin and Paley carried out work on the church, including removing the galleries, repairing the roof, and installing new choir stalls and a font. On 1 November 1995 the church was declared redundant.  It was damaged by fire in 2004, and has since been converted for residential use.

Architecture

St Paul's is constructed in sandstone in 13th-century Gothic Revival style.  Its plan consists of a nave with a clerestory, north and south aisles, a chancel and a west tower.  The windows along the sides of the church, and in the tower, are lancets.  In the Buildings of England series, the authors describe the pinnacles on the tower as "like apologetic eyebrows".

External features

The churchyard contains the war graves of thirteen soldiers of World War I and an airman of World War II. In 2006 a commemorative memorial erected by the Commonwealth War Graves Commission was temporarily stored away from the church until the conversion of the building into apartments was completed.

See also

Listed buildings in Bury
List of ecclesiastical works by Austin and Paley (1895–1914)

References

Former Church of England church buildings
Former churches in Greater Manchester
Grade II listed churches in the Metropolitan Borough of Bury
Gothic Revival church buildings in Greater Manchester
19th-century Church of England church buildings
Austin and Paley buildings